Darien Downtown is a census-designated place (CDP) in the town of Darien, Fairfield County, Connecticut, United States. It represents the built-up center of town around the intersections of U.S. Route 1 (Boston Post Road), Connecticut Route 124 (Mansfield Avenue), and Connecticut Route 136 (Tokeneke Road). Interstate 95 passes through the southern part of the CDP, with access from Exit 11 (Route 1) and Exit 12 (Route 136). It was first listed as a CDP prior to the 2020 census.

References 

Census-designated places in Fairfield County, Connecticut
Census-designated places in Connecticut